Eric Puchner is an American novelist and short story writer.

Life
His short stories have appeared in Tin House, Chicago Tribune, The Sun, The Missouri Review, and Best New American Voices.  He was a fellow at Bread Loaf Writers' Conference. His story, "Beautiful Monsters", was selected by Tom Perrotta for the 2012 edition of The Best American Short Stories.

He attended Chadwick School high school. He taught at San Francisco State University, Stanford University, and Claremont McKenna College.
He currently teaches at Johns Hopkins University.

 He lives in Baltimore with his wife, novelist Katharine Noel, and their sons, Simon and Clem.

Awards
 Pushcart Prize XXVIII
 Wallace Stegner Fellowship 
 2006 National Endowment for the Arts grant
 Music Through the Floor, which was a New York Times Book Review Editor's Choice and a finalist for the New York Public Library Young Lions Fiction Award.
 PEN/Faulkner Award Finalist

Work

Novel
Model Home: A Novel, Simon and Schuster, 2010,

Short Stories
 
 Last Day on Earth. 2017

Non-Fiction

Anthologies
Best new American voices 2005, John Kulka, Natalie Danford, Francine Prose (eds), Harcourt, 2004,

References

External links
 Author's website
 "Eric Puchner", KQED
 Interview with Eric Puchner at Simon & Schuster
 Interview with Eric Puchner, The Southeast Review

San Francisco State University alumni
Stanford University alumni
1970 births
Living people
American short story writers
PEN/Faulkner Award for Fiction winners